is a Japanese professional boxer.

Professional boxing career

Early career

Bantamweight
Maruta made his professional debut against Jason Canoy on 22 November 2015. He won the fight by unanimous decision, with scores of 59–54, 59–56 and 58–55. Maruta faced the debuting Saranyu Kerdsuk in his second professional appearance, on 20 March 2016. He won the fight by a first-round technical knockout.

Maruta was scheduled to fight the undefeated 10–0 Wilbert Berondo for the vacant WBC Youth bantamweight title on 31 July 2016, at the Sumiyoshi Ward Center in Osaka, Japan. Maruta won the fight by a sixth-round technical knockout, flooring the shorter Bedondo with a right hook to the liver. He was up on all three of the judges' scorecards at the time of the stoppage.

Maruta made his first WBC Youth title defense against Joe Tejones on 23 November 2016, at the Sumiyoshi SportsCenter in Osaka, Japan. He won the fight by a seventh-round knockout. Maruta dropped Tejones with a body shot, which left the Filipino challenger unable to beat the ten count. Maruta made his second title defense against Hamson Lamandau on 26 March 2017. He won the fight by a sixth-round knockout, flooring Lamandau with a barrage of body strikes.

Super bantamweight
Maruta challenged the 36-year old OPBF super bantamweight champion Hidenori Otake on 13 October 2017. Although the fight started out evenly, Otake began to take over from the fifth round onward, and won the fight by unanimous decision. Two judges scored the fight 116–112 for Otake, while the third judge scored the fight 117–111 in his favor. During the post-fight interview, Maruta revealed that he had fractured his the middle finger of his left hand, stating: "It's my fault that I hurt my left hand. I can't say anything if I lose... If we fight again, I can winm I think".

Maruta remained at super bantamweight for his next three bouts as well. After easily beating the over-matched and debuting Ratipong Laobankho by a first-round knockout on 21 December 2017, Maruta was booked to face Arega Yunian on 22 April 2018. He won the fight by a third-round knockout. Maruta was next scheduled to face the interim OPBF super bantamweight champion Ben Mananquil on 23 August 2018. The fight was ruled a split draw. Two of the judges awarded a 77–75 scorecard to Manaquil and Maruta each, while the third judge scored the fight an even 76–76 draw.

Featherweight

Early featherweight career
Maruta moved up to featherweight in order to face Tsuyoshi Tameda on 3 December 2018. He won the fight by a fifth-round technical knockout. Maruta dropped Tameda at the midway point of the round with a one-two, and finished him with a flurry of punches after the fight resumed. Maruta faced the experienced Coach Hiroto on May 1, 2019. He won his second fight at a new weight by unanimous decision, with all three judges scoring the fight 80–72 for him. Maruta was next scheduled to face the former Japanese featherweight champion Takenori Ohashi in a title eliminator for that very same belt. The fight headlined "The Strongest Challenger" event on 26 October 2019, which featured three other title eliminators. Maruta won the fight by a third-round technical knockout. He managed to inflict enough damage to Ohashi to open a cut on the bridge of his nose, which forced the ringside physician to stop the bout.

Japanese featherweight champion
Maruta challenged the reigning Japanese featherweight champion Ryo Sagawa, in what was Sagawa's third title defense. The fight took place on 11 February 2021, at the Korakuen Hall in Tokyo, Japan. Despite coming into the fight as a slight underdog, Maruta won the fight by a seventh-round technical knockout. Maruta was able to floor Sagawa with a counter right straight near the end of the seventh round. Although Sagawa was able to beat the count, he was finished with a flurry of punches after the action resumed.

Maruta was booked to make his first Japanese title defense against the #8 ranked Japanese featherweight contender Ryo Hino. The bout was scheduled as the main event of "Dangan 246", which took place at the Korakuen Hall in Tokyo, Japan on 27 November 2021. Maruta retained the title by unanimous decision. Two of the judges scored the fight 97–91 in his favor, while the third judge scored it 96–92 for him. Maruta knocked the challenger down twice, the first time with a right straight near the end of the third round, and the second time with a flurry of punches in the fifth round.

Maruta was booked to make his second Japanese featherweight title defense against the mandatory challenger Reiya Abe on 15 May 2022, at the Sumida Ward General Gymnasium in Sumida, Tokyo. Aside from the Japanese title, the vacant WBO Asia Pacific featherweight strap was on the line as well. He lost the fight by unanimous decision, with scores of 118–109, 116–111 and 115–112.

Super lightweight
Maruta is scheduled to face Hong Quan Dinh for the WBO Oriental super lightweight title on 21 April 2023, at the Intercontinental Hotel in Ho Chi Minh City, Vietnam.

Professional boxing record

References

Living people
1997 births
Japanese male boxers
Sportspeople from Hyōgo Prefecture
Bantamweight boxers
Super-bantamweight boxers
Featherweight boxers